Rataje is a municipality and village in Kroměříž District in the Zlín Region of the Czech Republic. It has about 1,200 inhabitants.

Administrative parts
Villages of Popovice and Sobělice are administrative parts of Rataje.

References

Villages in Kroměříž District